RoadRUNNER Transit is the local public transit authority serving Las Cruces, New Mexico

The RoadRUNNER Transit Bus Tracker is an online service that riders can use to locate a bus in real time, and estimate its arrival time.

Routes
All bus routes operate Monday-Saturday.  There is no Sunday service.

RoadRUNNER Transit City Wide Map

RoadRUNNER Transit Route 1 Map and Schedule

RoadRUNNER Transit Route 2 Map and Schedule

RoadRUNNER Transit Route 3 Map and Schedule

RoadRUNNER Transit Route 4 Map and Schedule

RoadRUNNER Transit Route 6 Map and Schedule

RoadRUNNER Transit Route 7 Map and Schedule

RoadRUNNER Transit Route 8 Map and Schedule

RoadRUNNER Transit NMSU Route Maps and Schedule

Fares

*Limit of 3

Fleet

Current fleet

In addition, RoadRUNNER Transit added two new low-floor minibuses in 2011.  These buses are used on both fixed route and paratransit service.

Retired fleet

Future plans
RoadRUNNER Transit unveiled their 2010-2015 Transit Strategic Plan on August 20, 2009.  Some ongoing improvements include but are not limited to increased frequency and number of routes and the addition of more bus shelters.  Short-term plans include improvements to ADA facilities, addition of Braille to bus stop posts, extended Saturday service, and the addition of hybrid electric buses.

References

External links
[www.las-cruces.org/Departments/Transportation/RoadRUNNER Transit.aspx RoadRUNNER Transit official site]

Bus transportation in New Mexico
Transportation in Doña Ana County, New Mexico
Las Cruces, New Mexico
Transit agencies in the United States